Liu Fu (born 7 April 1957) is a Chinese former cyclist. He competed in the team time trial event at the 1984 Summer Olympics and 1978 Asian Games.

References

External links
 

1957 births
Living people
Chinese male cyclists
Olympic cyclists of China
Cyclists at the 1984 Summer Olympics
Place of birth missing (living people)
Asian Games medalists in cycling
Cyclists at the 1978 Asian Games
Medalists at the 1978 Asian Games
Asian Games silver medalists for China
20th-century Chinese people
21st-century Chinese people